The Iglesia de Santo Tomé is a church located in the historical center of the city of Toledo (Spain), and was founded after the reconquest of this city by King Alfonso VI of León. It appears quoted in the 12th century, as constructed on the site of an old mosque of the 11th century. This mosque, together with other mosques in the city, were used as Christian churches without major changes, since in the taking of the city there was no destruction of buildings.

However, at the beginning of the 14th century, being in a ruinous state the church was totally rebuilt in charge of Gonzalo Ruiz de Toledo, Lord of Orgaz, and the old minaret of the mosque was transformed into a bell tower in Mudéjar style. Its fame is mainly due to the fact that it contains the painting The Burial of the Count of Orgaz by El Greco, which can be seen by accessing the back of church.

Interior 
The building consists of three naves with crossing, covered by barrel vault and polygonal apse. In order to construct the greater chapel, with mixture of Mudéjar and Gothic, the Lord of Orgaz ordered to demolish the old head and elevate the central dome in form of Rub el Hizb with the nerves painted. On the side of the gospel, near the high altar, a door leads to the entrance of the bell-tower and from there it can be climbed by means of a staircase.

It has the church in its chapels, two baroque reredos, one plateresque and a baptismal font of the 16th century. It highlights an image of the Virgin Mary of 12th century and the reredos with Ionic elements of the greater chapel of the 19th century, that replaced an earlier churrigueresque one, in this reredos is in its central part a painting, "The unbelief of St. Thomas", by the painter Vicente López Portaña."

Chapel of the Conception 

At the feet of the nave corresponding to the side of the Epistle, in the so-called Chapel of the Conception is buried by his own request in his will, Gonzalo Ruiz de Toledo, mayor of Toledo, benefactor of this temple and dead in 1323. According to a legend, in its burial appeared Saint Stephen and Augustine of Hippo to place it in his burial, the mentioned miracle is the one that is represented on his tomb, the painting "Burial of the Count of Orgaz" made by El Greco in 1584 by order of which it was in that time parish priest of the church Andrés Núñez de Toledo, which for this occasion did the reforms constituted the creation of a new quadrangular plan covered by a half-domed vault and on the walls to adore four half-point arches, inside one of them was placed a gravestone engraved with the explanation of the miracle and on top of it, adapting itself to the arc of the wall, the painting.

The inscription of the epitaph in Latin and gold letters on black marble was performed by Alvar Gómez de Castro.

Exterior tower 

The old minaret rebuilt in the 14th century by the lord of Orgaz, is of square plan, in what can be called Toledan Mudéjar, with masonry and brick very well preserved and based on the one of the Iglesia de San Román of the same city. The tower contains incrustations of glazed ceramics and in its two upper bodies, double bell, groups of two and three windows open and between these two floors a frieze decoration of blind archery with lobulated arches and separated by small columns of glazed clay. The crowning is made with a kind of string of "sawtooth".

Next to a twinned window of the tower on the second floor, is embedded a Visigothic plate-niche of white marble with scallop and cross patada adorned with the letters Alpha and Omega and studied as a similar piece to the prototype realized in the workshops of Mérida, that would have extended its influence in those of Toledo.

Access to the church
The church is opened on a daily basis to allow the public to view the painting. An entrance fee is charged.

References

Bibliography

External links 

 Description of the Iglesia de Santo Tomé in toledomonumental.com
Photos and history in Maravillas Ocultas de España
 Iglesia de Santo Tomé in Arte Viaje. Consulted: June 19, 2011.

Roman Catholic churches in Toledo, Spain
Former mosques in Spain
Mudéjar architecture in Castilla–La Mancha
Romanesque architecture in Castilla–La Mancha
11th-century mosques
12th-century Roman Catholic church buildings in Spain
14th-century Roman Catholic church buildings in Spain
Bien de Interés Cultural landmarks in the City of Toledo